Jana Majunke (born  21 August 1990) is a German Paralympic cyclist.

Majunke competed at the 2016 Paralympic Games where she won a bronze medal in the women's road race T1–2 event and at the 2020 Paralympic Games where she won gold medals in the Women's road time trial T1–2 and road race T1–2 events.

References

External links
 
 

1990 births
Living people
German female cyclists
Paralympic cyclists of Germany
Paralympic bronze medalists for Germany
 Cyclists at the 2016 Summer Paralympics
Medalists at the 2016 Summer Paralympics
Paralympic medalists in cycling
German disabled sportspeople
Sportspeople from Cottbus
Cyclists at the 2020 Summer Paralympics
Medalists at the 2020 Summer Paralympics
Paralympic gold medalists for Germany
Cyclists from Saxony
20th-century German women
21st-century German women